Akre or Aqrah is a city in the Duhok Governorate, Kurdistan Region in Iraq. Akre is known for its celebrations of Newroz.

Etymology
The name "Akre" stems from the Kurdish word "Agir" meaning "fire".

History  

The city was built in the 7th century and is one of the oldest continuously inhabited cities in the world. The Medes ruled the city from 612 to 550 BC in what is known as its golden age. Zoroastrian Prince Zand was the prince of the city. In year 115, the town came under Roman control commanded by Emperor Trajan and he set up a victory statue in the city. However, the locals quickly revolted and removed the statue. In 1133, the city was invaded by Imad al-Din Zengi of the Zengid dynasty who destroyed the defense wall of the city.

The city was the fief of the Kurdish Humaydi tribe since the 10th century, as such, Yaqut al-Hamawi, indicated that it was also known as ‘Aqr al-Ḥumaydiya. The 14th-century Shihab al-Umari, also noted the presence of the Yazidi Dasni tribe. The decline of the Principality of Bitlis from the 1500s and 1700s allowed Bahdinan to take Akre and its surroundings. Bahdinan would however lose the town to Emir Muhammad Kor of the Soran Emirate in 1833. Before losing the city, the Bahdinan era of the city saw significant cultural and economic developments and constructions. The city wall was also rebuilt with alabaster. However, during the 18th century, the city fell victim to various military campaigns from Soran Emirate which ultimately captured the city in 1833. The city would be captured by the Ottomans in 1842 due to its strategic location and continued to be under Ottoman rule until 1918. During this period, it was administered as part of the Mosul Vilayet and was populated by both Christians, Jews and Muslims.

20th century 
In 1947, 90% of the population was Kurdish.

Notable natives
<div style="width:75%">
 Rauf Akreyi, Iraqi kurdish journalist
 Dr. Widad Akreyi, award-winning international humanitarian, medical expert, author
 Hiner Saleem, Kurdish film director
 Yitzhak Mordechai, former Israeli General 
 Hoshyar Zebari, former Iraqi Foreign minister

Bibliography

References 

Cities in Iraqi Kurdistan
Akre
Populated places in Dohuk Province
District capitals of Iraq
Kurdish settlements in Iraq
Assyrian communities in Iraq
Historic Jewish communities in Iraq